Lymwood is a rural locality in the local government area of King Island on King Island in Bass Strait, north of Tasmania.
The 2016 census determined a population of 114 for the state suburb of Lymwood.

History
Lymwood was the name of the original property in the area.

Geography
Bass Strait forms the south-eastern boundary, and the Seal River forms the south-western boundary.

Road infrastructure
The B25 route (Grassy Road) runs through from north to south-east. Route C201 (Old Grassy Road) starts at an intersection with B25 and runs north-west until it exits. Route C202 (Yarra Creek Road) starts at an intersection with B25 and runs east until it exits.

References

King Island (Tasmania)
Towns in Tasmania